KBG syndrome is a rare genetic disease that is the result of a mutation in the ANKRD11 gene at location 16q24.3. Only about a hundred known cases have been reported, although it is expected to be under-reported.

The syndrome was first described by Herrmann in 1975 in three distinct families. Herrmann proposed the name KBG syndrome after the initials of affected families' last names, which aren't known to the general public.

Characteristics 
Features of individuals with KBG may include:
 Distinctive facial features
 Unusually large upper front teeth (macrodontia)
 A short, wide skull (brachycephaly)
 Wide eyebrows that may grow together (synophrys)
 Prominent nasal bridge
 Thin upper lip
 Widely spaced eyebrows (hypertelorism)
 A longer space between the bridge of the nose and upper lip (long philtrum)
 Skeletal abnormalities
 Cervical ribs
 Delayed bone age
 Curved Pinky Fingers
 Flat Feet
 Short Stature
 Emotional or behavioral changes
 Autism
 ADHD
 Anxiety
 Developmental delays or mild to moderate intellectual disabilities

References

Patient support organizations
KBG Foundation

External links 

Rare syndromes